Martell is a valley and comune (municipality) in South Tyrol in northern Italy.
It is the only comune in Italy without any native speakers of Italian.

Geography

Martell borders mainly to the municipality of Latsch at the bottom of the valley. Other neighbors based in the Vinschgau of the Adige are Stilfs, Laas and Schlanders. Ulten is in the neighboring valley to the East, while Peio, Rabbi and Valfurva are to the south.

Frazioni
Apart from the main village of Gand (Ganda), the municipality of Martell contains the frazioni (subdivisions, mainly villages and hamlets) of Ennetal (Val d'Enne), Ennewasser (Transacqua), Gand (Ganda), Meiern, and Sonnenberg (Montesole), as well as several farms and hotels.

History

Coat-of-arms
The emblem shows two-headed sable eagle, with an or halo, placed on argent mountain and azure background. The two colors means that the municipality reaches a high altitude, up to the glaciers. According to legend, the right to adorn the city arms with the imperial eagle was recognized for the courage showed, from the residents, in the Battle of Schanzen nearby Colorano. The emblem was adopted in 1969.

Society

Linguistic distribution
According to the 2011 census, 100% of the population speak German as first language, making it the only comune in Italy without any native speakers of Italian.

Demographic evolution

References

External links
 Homepage of the municipality

Municipalities of South Tyrol